The monarchy of Australia is Australia's form of government embodied by the Australian sovereign and head of state. The Australian monarchy is a constitutional monarchy, modelled on the Westminster system of parliamentary government, while incorporating features unique to the Constitution of Australia.

The present monarch is Charles III, styled King of Australia, who has reigned since 8 September 2022. He is represented in Australia as a whole by the governor-general, in accordance with the Australian Constitution and letters patent from the king. In each of the Australian states, according to the state constitutions, by a governor, assisted by a lieutenant-governor. The monarch appoints the governor-general and the governors, on the advice of the respective State and Federal executive governments. These are now almost the only constitutional functions of the monarch with regard to Australia.

Australian constitutional law provides that the monarch of the United Kingdom is also the monarch in Australia. This is understood today to constitute a separate Australian monarchy, the monarch acting with regard to Australian affairs exclusively upon the advice of Australian ministers. Australia is one of the Commonwealth realms, fifteen independent countries that share the same person as monarch and head of state.

International and domestic aspects

The monarch of Australia is the same person as the monarch of the 14 other Commonwealth realms within the 56-member Commonwealth of Nations; however, each realm is independent of the others, with the monarchy having a separate character in each. Effective with the Australia Act 1986, no British government can advise the monarch on any matters pertinent to Australia. On all matters of the Australian Commonwealth, the monarch is advised by Australian federal ministers of the Crown, Likewise, on all matters relating to any Australian state, the monarch is advised by the ministers of the Crown of that state. In 1999 the High Court of Australia held in Sue v Hill that, at least since the Australia Act 1986, the United Kingdom has been a foreign power in regard to Australia's domestic and foreign affairs; it followed that a British citizen was a citizen of a foreign power and incapable of being a member of the Australian Parliament, pursuant to Section 44(i) of the Australian Constitution. In 2001 the High Court held that, until the United Kingdom became a foreign power, all British subjects were subjects of the monarch in right of the United Kingdom and thus could not be classified as aliens within the meaning of Section 51(xix) of the constitution.

Title

The title of the monarch is Charles the Third, by the Grace of God King of Australia and His other Realms and Territories, Head of the Commonwealth.

Prior to 1953, the title had simply been the same as that in the United Kingdom. A change in the title resulted from occasional discussion and an eventual meeting of Commonwealth representatives in London in December 1952, at which Canada's preferred format for Queen Elizabeth II's title was Elizabeth the Second, by the Grace of God, Queen of [Realm] and of Her other realms and territories, Head of the Commonwealth, Defender of the Faith. Australia, however, wished to have the United Kingdom mentioned as well. Thus, the resolution was a title that included the United Kingdom but, for the first time, also separately mentioned Australia and the other Commonwealth realms. The passage of a new Royal Style and Titles Act by the Parliament of Australia put these recommendations into law.

It was proposed by the Cabinet headed by Gough Whitlam that the title be amended to "denote the precedence of Australia, the equality of the United Kingdom and each other sovereign nation under the Crown, and the separation of Church and State." A new Royal Titles and Styles Bill that removed specific reference to the monarch's role as Queen of the United Kingdom was passed by the federal parliament, but the Governor-General, Sir Paul Hasluck, reserved Royal Assent "for Her Majesty's pleasure" (similarly to Governor-General Sir William McKell's actions with the 1953 Royal Titles and Styles Bill). Queen Elizabeth II signed her assent at Government House, Canberra, on 19 October 1973.

Succession

Succession is according to British laws that have been incorporated into Australian law, both federal and state: namely, the Bill of Rights 1689 and the Act of Settlement 1701. These acts limit the succession to the natural (non-adopted), legitimate descendants of Sophia, Electress of Hanover, and stipulate that the monarch must be in communion with the Church of England upon ascending the throne. By adhering to the Statute of Westminster in 1942, Australia agreed to change its rules of succession only in agreement with the United Kingdom and the other then Dominions. In that spirit, the Perth Agreement of 2011 among the Commonwealth realms committed all amend to amending the line of succession to follow absolute primogeniture for those in the Royal family born in and after 2011. As part of the Agreement, Australia, along with the other realms, repealed the Royal Marriages Act 1772, which gave precedence to male heirs and excluded from succession a person married to a Roman Catholic. In Australia, federal legislation to do this required request and concurrence from all of the states, so that the necessary federal legislation was not passed until 24 March 2015, and took effect on 26 March 2015.

Upon a demise of the Crown (the death or abdication of a sovereign), it is customary for the accession of the new monarch to be publicly proclaimed by the governor-general on behalf of the Federal Executive Council, which meets at Government House, Canberra, after the accession. Parallel proclamations are made by the governors in each state. Regardless of any proclamations, the late sovereign's heir immediately and automatically succeeds, without any need for confirmation or further ceremony. Following an appropriate period of mourning, the monarch is also crowned in the United Kingdom, though this ritual is not necessary for a sovereign to reign; for example, Edward VIII was never crowned, yet was undoubtedly king during his short time on the throne. After an individual ascends the throne, he or she typically continues to reign until death. There is no provision in the law for a monarch to unilaterally abdicate; the only Australian monarch to abdicate, Edward VIII, did so as a consequence of abdicating as monarch of the United Kingdom, with which the Australian government had agreed.

Finance
In 2018, a trip by Charles, then Prince of Wales, to the Commonwealth country of Vanuatu, escorted by Australian Minister for Foreign Affairs Julie Bishop in between a tour of Queensland and the Northern Territory, was paid for by the Australian government.

Residences

The governor-general has two official residences, Government House in Canberra, commonly known as "Yarralumla", and Admiralty House in Sydney. The Australian monarch stays there when visiting Canberra, as do visiting heads of state.

Personification of the state

The monarch is also the locus of oaths of allegiance; many employees of the Crown are required by law to recite this oath before taking their posts, such as all members of the Commonwealth parliament, all members of the state and territorial parliaments, as well as all magistrates, judges, police officers and justices of the peace. This is in reciprocation to the sovereign's Coronation Oath, wherein he or she promises "to govern the Peoples of... Australia... according to their respective laws and customs". New appointees to the Federal Cabinet currently also swear an oath that includes allegiance to the monarch before taking their post. However, as this oath is not written in law, it has not always been observed and depends on the form chosen by the prime minister of the time, suggested to the Governor-General. In December 2007, Kevin Rudd did not swear allegiance to the sovereign when sworn in by the governor-general, making him the first prime minister to do so; however, he (like all other members of parliament) did swear allegiance to the Queen, as required by law, when sworn in by the governor-general as newly elected parliamentarians. Similarly, the Oath of Citizenship contained a statement of allegiance to the reigning monarch until 1994, when a pledge of allegiance to "Australia" and its values was introduced. The High Court found, in 2002, though, that allegiance to the monarch of Australia was the "fundamental criterion of membership" in the Australian body politic, from a constitutional, rather than statutory, point of view.

Head of state

Key features of Australia's system of government include its basis on a combination of "written" and "unwritten rules", comprising the sovereign and the governors, and the governor-general. The constitution does not mention the term "head of state". The Constitution defines the governor-general as the monarch's representative. According to the Australian Parliamentary Library, Australia's head of state is the monarch, and its head of government is the prime minister, with powers limited by both law and convention for government to be carried on democratically. The federal constitution provides that the monarch is part of the Parliament and is empowered to appoint the governor-general as the monarch's representative, while the executive power of the Commonwealth which is vested in the monarch is exercisable by the governor-general as the monarch's representative. The few functions which the monarch does perform (such as appointing the governor-general) are done on advice from the prime minister.

A review of the political situation in Australia from the 1970s to the present shows that, while the position of the monarch as head of state has not been altered, some Australians have argued in favour of changing the constitution into a form of republican government that would, they propose, be better suited to the Commonwealth of Australia than the current monarchy. While current official sources use the description "head of state" for the monarch, in the lead up to the republic referendum in 1999, Sir David Smith proposed an alternative explanation, that Australia already has a head of state in the person of the governor-general, who since 1965 has invariably been an Australian citizen. This view has some support within the group Australians for Constitutional Monarchy. It is designed to counter the objections by republicans, such as the Australian Republic Movement, that no Australian can become, or can be involved in choosing, the Australian head of state. The leading textbook on Australian constitutional law formulates the position thus: "The Queen, as represented in Australia by the governor-general, is Australia's head of state."

Constitutional role and royal prerogative

Australia has a written constitution based on the Westminster model of government, with some federal elements and a distinct separation of powers. It gives Australia a parliamentary system of government, wherein the role of the Sovereign and Governor-General is both legal and practical. The sovereign of Australia is represented in the federal sphere by the Governor-General—appointed by the monarch on the advice of the Prime Minister of Australia—and in each state by a governor—appointed by the monarch upon the advice of the relevant state premier.

Executive

In Australia's constitutional system, one of the main duties of the governor-general is to appoint a prime minister, who thereafter heads the Cabinet and advises the governor-general on how to execute his or her executive powers over all aspects of government operations and foreign affairs. This means that the monarch's and the viceroy's roles are primarily symbolic and cultural, acting as a symbol of the legal authority under which all governments and agencies operate. In practice, ministers direct the use of the royal prerogative that resides in the monarch, which includes the privilege to declare war, maintain peace, and direct the actions of the Australian Defence Force. The governor-general is empowered by the constitution to summon and prorogue parliament, and call elections; however the powers are almost never exercised without advice from the Prime Minister. Still, the royal prerogative belongs to the Crown, and not to any of the ministers and the governor-general may unilaterally use these powers in exceptional constitutional crisis situations, such as when, during the 1975 Australian constitutional crisis, Sir John Kerr dismissed Prime Minister Gough Whitlam, on the occasion of a stalemate over government funding between the House of Representatives and the Senate.

There are also a few duties which must be specifically performed by the monarch. These include signing the appointment papers of governors-general, the confirmation of the creation of awards of Australian honours, and the approval of any change in their Australian title.

In accordance with convention, the governor-general, to maintain the stability of government, must appoint as prime minister the individual most likely to maintain the support of the House of Representatives: usually the leader of the political party with a majority in that house, but also when no party or coalition holds a majority (referred to as a minority government situation), or other scenarios in which the governor-general's judgement about the most suitable candidate for prime minister has to be brought into play. The governor-general also appoints to Cabinet the other ministers of the Crown, who are, in turn, accountable to the Parliament, and through it, to the people. The King is informed by his viceroy of the acceptance of the resignation of a prime minister and the swearing-in of a new prime minister and other members of the ministry, and he holds audience with his Australian ministers where possible.

Members of various executive agencies and other officials are appointed by the governor-general, including High Court Judges. Ministers and parliamentary secretaries are also appointed to the Federal Executive Council. Public inquiries are also commissioned by the Crown through a Royal Warrant, and are called Royal Commissions. A casual vacancy in the Senate is filled by an appointee from the same political party by a state parliament or state governor.

Foreign affairs 
The royal prerogative also extends to foreign affairs: the governor-general-in-Council negotiates and ratifies treaties, alliances, and international agreements. As with other uses of the royal prerogative, no parliamentary approval is required.

Parliament

The sovereign, along with the Senate and the House of Representatives, being one of the three components of parliament, is called the King-in-Parliament. The authority of the Crown therein is embodied in the mace (House of Representatives) and Black Rod (Senate), which both bear a crown at their apex. The monarch and viceroy do not, however, participate in the legislative process save for the granting of Royal Assent by the governor-general. Further, the constitution outlines that the governor-general alone is responsible for summoning, proroguing, and dissolving parliament.

All laws in Australia, except in the Australian Capital Territory (ACT) Legislative Assembly, are enacted only with the granting of Royal Assent, done by the governor-general, relevant state governor, or Administrator in the case of the Northern Territory (NT), with the Great Seal of Australia or the appropriate state or territory seal. Laws passed by the ACT and NT legislatures, unlike their state counterparts, are subject to the oversight of the government of Australia and can be disallowed by the Australian Parliament. The governor-general may reserve a bill "for the King's pleasure"; that is withhold his consent to the bill and present it to the sovereign for their personal decision. Under the constitution, the sovereign also has the power to disallow a bill within one year of the governor-general having granted Royal Assent.

Courts

In Australia, the sovereign is deemed the fount of justice. However, he does not personally rule in judicial cases, meaning that judicial functions are normally performed only in the monarch's name. Criminal offences are legally deemed to be offences against the sovereign and proceedings for indictable offences are brought in the sovereign's name in the form of The King against [Name] (sometimes also referred to as the Crown against [Name]). Hence, the common law holds that the sovereign "can do no wrong"; the monarch cannot be prosecuted in his or her own courts for criminal offences. Civil lawsuits against the Crown in its public capacity (that is, lawsuits against the government) are permitted; however, lawsuits against the monarch personally are not cognisable. In international cases, as a sovereign and under established principles of international law, the king of Australia is not subject to suit in foreign courts without his express consent. The prerogative of mercy lies with the monarch, and is exercised in the state jurisdictions by the governors.

States and territories

In accordance with the Australia Act 1986, the Sovereign has the power to appoint, on the advice of the relevant state premier, a governor in each of the Australian states, who themselves appoint executive bodies, as well as people to fill casual Senate vacancies, if the relevant state parliament is not in session. The state governors continue to serve as the direct representatives of the King, in no way subordinate to the Governor-General, and they carry out on her behalf all of the King's constitutional and ceremonial duties in respect of their respective state. The Northern Territory and the Australian Capital Territory resemble states in many respects, but are administered directly by the Commonwealth of Australia; an administrator, appointed by the Governor-General upon the advice of the Commonwealth government, takes the place of a state governor in the Northern Territory. The Australian Capital Territory has no equivalent position.

Cultural role

Royal presence and duties

Official duties involve the sovereign representing the state at home or abroad, or other royal family members participating in a government-organised ceremony either in Australia or elsewhere. The sovereign and/or his or her family have participated in events such as various centennials and bicentennials; Australia Day; the openings of Olympic and other games; award ceremonies; D-Day commemorations; anniversaries of the monarch's accession; and the like. 

Other royals have participated in Australian ceremonies or undertaken duties abroad, such as Prince Charles at the Anzac Day ceremonies at Gallipoli, or when the Queen, Prince Charles, and Princess Anne participated in Australian ceremonies for the anniversary of D-Day in France in 2004. On 22 February 2009, Princess Anne represented the Queen at the National Bushfires Memorial Service in Melbourne. The Queen also showed her support for the people of Australia by making a personal statement about the bushfires and by also making a private donation to the Australian Red Cross Appeal. The Duke of Edinburgh was the first to sign a book of condolences at the Australian High Commission in London.

Royal tours traditionally see large crowds of people turn out, often waving flags and snapping photos of the visitors. Republicans have dismissed this as "the cult of celebrity". However, historian Jane Connors, thinks there is something more to it; after William and Catherine toured the Blue Mountains after devastating bush fires in 2014, Dr Connors opined:

"They [William and Catherine] went to a street where about nine houses had been burnt down. And it did seem to matter to the people in that street and in the Blue Mountains that they were royal... The quotes from the people who had brought their families along were, 'I've brought my grandson with me because this will be his moment of history.' Or, 'I've bought my daughter because this will be her moment of history, these will be her royals in the way the previous generation were my royals.' And there is still that sense that having the Royal Family come to see you is more healing and significant than just having anyone come to see you. That's still very much with us and they still seem to be able pull together that emotion."

The Crown and the Australian Defence Force

Section 68 of the Australian Constitution says: "The command in chief of the naval and military forces of the Commonwealth is vested in the governor-general as the Queen's (monarch's) representative." In practice, however, the governor-general does not play any part in the ADF's command structure other than following the advice of the Minister for Defence in the normal form of executive government.

Australian naval vessels bear the prefix His Majesty's Australian Ship (HMAS) and many regiments carry the "royal" prefix.

Members of the royal family have presided over military ceremonies, including Trooping the Colour ceremonies, inspections of the troops, and anniversaries of key battles. When the Queen was in Canberra, she laid wreaths at the Australian War Memorial. In 2003, the Queen acted in her capacity as Australian monarch when she dedicated the Australian War Memorial in Hyde Park, London.

Some members of the royal family are Colonels-in-Chief of Australian regiments, including: the Royal Regiment of Australian Artillery; Royal Australian Army Medical Corps; the Royal Australian Armoured Corps and the Royal Australian Corps of Signals, amongst many others. The Queen's late husband, the Duke of Edinburgh, was an Admiral of the Fleet.

Australian royal symbols
Royal symbols are the visual and auditory identifiers of the Australian monarchy. The main symbol of the monarchy is the sovereign himself, and his image is thus used to signify Australian sovereignty. Queen Elizabeth II's portrait, for instance, currently appears on all Australian coins, the five-dollar banknote, and postage stamps such as the Queen's Birthday stamp, issued by Australia Post every year since 1980. A Crown is depicted as a royal symbol that appears on the Australian coat of arms, and on various medals and awards. The latter reflects the monarch's place as the fount of honour—the formal head of the Australian honours and awards system.

The sovereign is further both mentioned in and the subject of songs and loyal toasts. Australia inherited the royal anthem "God Save the King" (alternatively, "God Save the Queen" in the reign of a female monarch) from the United Kingdom. It was the national anthem of Australia until 1984, and has since been retained as the country's royal anthem, its use generally restricted to official occasions where the monarch or a member of the royal family is present.

The Queen's Personal Australian Flag, adopted in 1962, was used to signify Queen Elizabeth II's presence when she visited Australia. It features the coat of arms of Australia in banner form, defaced with a gold seven-pointed federation star with a blue disc containing the crowned letter E, surrounded by a garland of golden roses. Each of the six sections of the flag represents the heraldic badge of the Australian states, and the whole is surrounded by an ermine border representing the federation of the states. The current monarch, King Charles III, has not adopted a personal flag for Australia.

As in other Commonwealth realms, the King's Official Birthday is a public holiday and, in Australia, is observed on the second Monday in June in all states and territories, except Queensland and Western Australia. In Queensland, it is celebrated on the first Monday in October, and in Western Australia it is usually the last Monday of September or the first Monday of October. Celebrations are mainly official, including the Australian Birthday Honours list and military ceremonies.

Religious role

Until its new constitution went into force in 1962, the Anglican Church of Australia was part of the Church of England. Its titular head was consequently the monarch, in his or her capacity as Supreme Governor of the Church of England. However, unlike in England, Anglicanism was never established as a state religion in Australia.

History

The development of a distinctly Australian monarchy came about through a complex set of incremental events, beginning in 1770, when Captain James Cook, in the name of, and under instruction from, King George III, claimed the east coast of Australia. Colonies were eventually founded across the continent, all of them ruled by the monarch of the United Kingdom, upon the advice of his or her British ministers, the Secretary of State for the Colonies, in particular. After Queen Victoria's granting of Royal Assent to the Commonwealth of Australia Constitution Act on 9 July 1900, which brought about Federation in 1901, whereupon the six colonies became the states of Australia, the relationship between the state governments and the Crown remained as it was pre-1901: References in the constitution to "the Queen" meant the government of the United Kingdom (in the formation of which Australians had no say) and the Colonial Laws Validity Act 1865by which colonial laws deemed repugnant to imperial (British) law in force in the colony were rendered void and inoperativeremained in force in both the federal and state spheres; and all the governors, both of the Commonwealth and the states, remained appointees of the British monarch on the advice of the British Cabinet, a situation that continued even after Australia was recognised as a Dominion of the British Empire in 1907.

In response to calls from some Dominions for a re-evaluation in their status under the Crown after their sacrifice and performance in the First World War, a series of Imperial Conferences was held in London, from 1917 on, which resulted in the Balfour Declaration of 1926, which provided that the United Kingdom and the Dominions were to be considered as "autonomous communities within the British Empire, equal in status, in no way subordinate to one another in any aspect of their domestic or external affairs, though united by a common allegiance to the Crown." The Royal and Parliamentary Titles Act 1927, an Act of the Westminster Parliament, was the first indication of a shift in the law, before the Imperial Conference of 1930 established that the Australian Cabinet could advise the sovereign directly on the choice of Governor-General, which ensured the independence of the office. The Crown was further separated amongst its dominions by the Statute of Westminster 1931, and, though it was not adopted by Australia until 1942 (retroactive to 3 September 1939).

The Curtin Labor Government appointed Prince Henry, Duke of Gloucester, as Governor-General during the Second World War. Curtin hoped the appointment might influence the British to despatch men and equipment to the Pacific War, and the selection of the brother of King George VI reaffirmed the important role of the Crown to the Australian nation at that time. The Queen became the first reigning monarch to visit Australia in 1954, greeted by huge crowds across the nation. In 1967, the Queen's son, Charles III (then Prince Charles), attended school in Geelong Grammar School in Corio, Victoria. Her grandson Prince Harry undertook a portion of his gap-year living and working in Australia in 2003.

The sovereign did not possess a title unique to Australia until the Australian parliament enacted the Royal Styles and Titles Act in 1953, after the accession of Elizabeth to the throne, and giving her the title of Queen of the United Kingdom, Australia and Her other Realms and Territories. Still, Elizabeth remained both as a queen who reigned in Australia both as Queen of Australia (in the federal jurisdiction) and Queen of the United Kingdom (in each of the states), as a result of the states not wishing to have the Statute of Westminster apply to them, believing that the status quo better protected their sovereign interests against an expansionist federal government, which left the Colonial Laws Validity Act in effect. Thus, the British government could stillat least in theory, if not with some difficulty in practicelegislate for the Australian states, and the viceroys in the states were appointed by and represented the sovereign of the United Kingdom, not that of Australia; as late as 1976, the British ministry advised the Queen to reject Colin Hannah as the nominee of the Queensland Cabinet for governor, and court cases from Australian states could be appealed directly to the Judicial Committee of the Privy Council in London, thereby bypassing the Australian High Court. In 1973 reference to the United Kingdom was removed by the Royal Style and Titles Act. Henceforth, the monarch would be styled uniquely as 'Queen of Australia'. The Queen signed her assent to the Act at Government House, Canberra that year, leading Senior Vice President of the Labor Party, Jack Egerton, to remark to her, "They tell me, love, you’ve been naturalised." It was with the passage of the Australia Act in 1986, which repealed the Colonial Laws Validity Act and abolished appeals of state cases to London, that the final vestiges of the British monarchy in Australia were removed, leaving a distinct Australian monarchy for the nation. The view in the Republic Advisory Committee's report in 1993 was that if, in 1901, Victoria, as Queen-Empress, symbolised the British Empire of which all Australians were subjects, all of the powers vested in the monarch under Australia's Constitution were now exercised on the advice of the Australian government.

The 1999 Australian republic referendum was defeated by 54.4 per cent of the populace, despite polls showing that the majority supported becoming a republic. It is believed the proposed model of the republic (not having a directly elected president) was unsatisfactory to most Australians. The referendum followed the recommendation of a 1998 Constitutional Convention called to discuss the issue of Australia becoming a republic. Still, nearly another ten years later, Kevin Rudd was appointed as Prime Minister, whereafter he affirmed that a republic was still a part of his party's platform, and stated his belief that the debate on constitutional change should continue.

Former Prime Minister Julia Gillard re-affirmed her party's platform about a possible future republic. She stated that she would like to see Australia become a republic, with an appropriate time being when there is a change in monarch. A statement unaligned to this position was recorded on 21 October 2011 at a reception in the presence of the Queen at Parliament House in Canberra when Gillard stated that the monarch is "a vital constitutional part of Australian democracy and would only ever be welcomed as a beloved and respected friend." The then Opposition Leader, Tony Abbott, a former head of Australians for Constitutional Monarchy stated on 21 October 2011, "Your Majesty, while 11 prime ministers and no less than 17 opposition leaders have come and gone, for 60 years you have been a presence in our national story and given the vagaries of public life, I'm confident that this will not be the final tally of the politicians that you have outlasted."

A Morgan poll taken in October 2011 found that support for constitutional change was at its lowest for 20 years. Of those surveyed 34 per cent were pro-republic as opposed to 55 per cent pro-monarchist, preferring to maintain the current constitutional arrangements. A peer-reviewed study published in the Australian Journal of Political Science in 2016 found that there had been a significant increase to support for monarchy in Australia after a twenty-year rapid decline following the 1992 annus horribilis.

A poll in November 2018 found support for the monarchy has climbed to a record high. A YouGov poll in July 2020 found that 62 per cent of respondents supporting replacing the monarch with an Australian head of state. This is an exception to the rule, however, as polls have shown a steady decline in support for republicanism since the 1999 referendum. A 2021 Ipsos poll found 40 per cent of respondents were opposed to Australia becoming a republic, 34 per cent were in favour and 26 per cent didn't know. This was the lowest support recorded for republicanism since 1979.

The Queen died on 8 September 2022. She was the longest serving monarch and was succeeded by her son, Charles III. Shortly after her death, the Prime Minister, Anthony Albanese, said that he would not hold a referendum on Australia becoming a republic during his first term.

The coronation of Charles III and Camilla is planned on 6 May 2023. The symbolic celebration will be presided by the Archbishop of Canterbury.

List of monarchs of Australia

The British Crown (1770–1939)

The Australian Crown (1939–present)
In 1939, the Australian Crown emerged as an independent entity from that of the British Crown due to the Statute of Westminster Adoption Act 1942 (retroactive to 3 September 1939).

Timeline of monarchs since Federation

See also

 Australian State Coach
 List of Australian organisations with royal patronage
 List of Commonwealth visits made by Elizabeth II
 List of prime ministers of Elizabeth II
 List of sovereign states headed by Elizabeth II
 Peerage of the Commonwealth of Australia
 Wattle Queen

Notes

  National Archives of Australia: King George VI (1936–52)
 National Museum of Australia: Royal Romance
  National Archives of Australia: Royal Visit 1954
  National Archives of Australia: Royal Visit 1963
  National Archives of Australia: Prince Charles
  Australian Government: Royal Visits to Australia
  National Archives of Australia: Royalty and Australian Society
  Yahoo News: Prince Edward to visit Vic fire victims
  ABC News: Royal couple set for busy Aust schedule
  Queen, Howard honour war dead
  World leaders hail D-Day veterans

References

Bibliography

External links

 Queen's Official website on Australia
 Governor-General of Australia
 Letters Patent – 21 August 1984
 Australians for Constitutional Monarchy
 The Australian Republican Movement
 The Australian Monarchist League

Australia
Australian constitutional law